The San Francisco Japanese School (SFJS) is a weekend Japanese school as well as a two week summer school serving the San Francisco Bay Area. The system, with its administrative offices in San Francisco, is a 501(c)(3) non-profit organization, and was the world's second largest overseas Japanese weekend school in 2006. The school is supported by the Japanese government.

The SFJS rents classrooms in four schools serving a total of over 1,600 students as of 2016. The student body was 1,116 in 2006.

Two of the schools are in San Francisco and two are in the South Bay. For elementary students it operates out of the A. P. Giannini Middle School in San Francisco and The Harker School Blackford Campus in San Jose. For junior high school and high school students it operates out of Lowell High School in San Francisco and the J. F. Kennedy Middle School in Cupertino.

History
The school was first established in 1968. The school previously had the English name  San Francisco Japanese Language Class, Inc (SFJLC), and it previously held junior high and high school-level classes at Hyde Junior High School in Cupertino while its elementary level classes were out of Kennedy Middle. At a later point it previously held high school classes at Herbert Hoover Middle School in San Francisco.

As of 2006, there were increasing numbers of Japanese permanent residents and fewer numbers of Japanese temporary residents. The economic decline of Japan and the reduction in overseas corporate postings was the cause of the latter condition.

See also
 History of the Japanese in San Francisco

References

Further reading
 梶田 正巳 and 松本 一子 (名古屋大学教育学部:愛知淑徳大学留学生別科). "<原著>サンフランシスコ日本語補習校と現地校に通う子どもたち" (Archive). Bulletin of the School of Education (名古屋大學教育學部紀要). Psychology (心理学) 46, 15-20, 1999-12-27. Nagoya University. See profile at CiNii. See profile at University of Nagoya Repository (名古屋大学学術機関リポジトリ). Alternate location (Archive).

External links
San Francisco Japanese School 
About San Francisco Japanese School 
San Francisco Japanese Language Class (Archive, 2002–2010)
San Francisco Japanese School English page (Archive)
San Francisco Japanese Language Class (Archive, 2001)

Japanese-American culture in San Francisco
Schools in San Francisco
Private schools in San Jose, California
Cupertino, California
Schools in Santa Clara County, California
San Francisco
1968 establishments in California
Educational institutions established in 1968